Milton Archie Ratcliffe (30 January 1893–1981) was an English footballer who played in the Football League for Blackpool, The Wednesday and Tranmere Rovers.

References

1893 births
1981 deaths
English footballers
Association football forwards
English Football League players
Nelson F.C. players
Blackpool F.C. players
Sheffield Wednesday F.C. players
Tranmere Rovers F.C. players